Tunisia (TUN) has organised the 2001 Mediterranean Games event in the capital Tunis, Tunisia.
Additional Information: 
Mediterranean Games 2001 (Tunisia)

Group A [in Stade Olympique El Menzah]
 5- 9 Tunisia    5-0 San Marino      
 9- 9 Tunisia    0-1 France       
        [Sahnoun 11]
11- 9 France     6-0 San Marino      [in Stade 15 Octobre, Bizerte]
        [Sahnoun 15pen, Hiroux 21, 31pen, Pontal 29, 77, Delporte 67]

 1.FRANCE              2  2  0  0  7- 0  6
 2.TUNISIA             2  1  0  1  5- 1  3
 3.San Marino          2  0  0  2  0-11  0

Group B [in Stade Olympique, Sousse]
 5- 9 Greece     1-2 Turkey
 9- 9 Turkey     1-1 Libya
11- 9 Greece     1-0 Libya

 1.TURKEY              2  1  1  0  3- 2  4
 2. Greece              2  1  0  1  2- 2  3
 3.Libya               2  0  1  1  1- 2  1

Group C [in Stade Taïeb Mhiri, Sfax]
 5- 9 Morocco    5-2 Algeria
 8- 9 Italy      2-1 Morocco
        [Sculli 42, Ferro 72; Aboud 69]
10- 9 Italy      2-1 Algeria

 1.ITALY               2  2  0  0  4- 2  6
 2.Morocco             2  1  0  1  6- 4  3
 3.Algeria             2  0  0  2  3- 7  0

Semifinals
13- 9 France     0-1 Italy           [in Stade 15 Octobre, Bizerte]
        [Cardinale 60]
13- 9 Turkey     0-1 Tunisia   [aet] [in Stade Olympique El Menzah]
        [Ben Achour 98]

Third Place Match
15- 9 France     2-0 Turkey          [in Stade 7 Novembre, Radès]
        [Pujol 25, 51]

Final
15- 9 Italy      0-1 Tunisia         [in Stade 7 Novembre, Radès]

References

Nations at the 2001 Mediterranean Games
2001
Mediterranean Games